is a district located in Okinawa Prefecture, Japan.

As of 2003, the district has an estimated population of 169,332 and the density of 1,216.03 persons per km2. The total area is 139.25 km2.

Towns and villages
Chatan
Kadena
Nishihara
Kitanakagusuku
Nakagusuku
Yomitan

Mergers
On April 1, 2005 Katsuren and Yonashiro were merged with the old cities of Gushikawa and Ishikawa to form the new city of Uruma.

Districts in Okinawa Prefecture